3782 Celle, provisional designation , is a bright Vestian asteroid and asynchronous binary system from the inner regions of the asteroid belt, approximately  in diameter. It was discovered on 3 October 1986, by Danish astronomer Poul Jensen at the Brorfelde Observatory in Denmark and named after the German city of Celle. The V-type asteroid has a rotation period of 3.84 hours. The discovery of its 2.3-kilometer minor-planet moon was announced in 2003.

Orbit and classification 

Celle is a core member of the Vesta family, one of the largest families in main belt. Vestian asteroids have a composition akin to cumulate eucrites (HED meteorites) and are thought to have originated deep within 4 Vesta's crust, possibly from the Rheasilvia crater, a large impact crater on its southern hemisphere near the South pole, formed as a result of a subcatastrophic collision. Vesta is the main belt's second-largest and second-most-massive body after .

Celle orbits the Sun in the inner asteroid belt at a distance of 2.2–2.6 AU once every 3 years and 9 months (1,371 days; semi-major axis of 2.42 AU). Its orbit has an eccentricity of 0.09 and an inclination of 5° with respect to the ecliptic.

Physical characteristics 

Celle is a bright V-type asteroid in the SMASS classification and according to the characterization made by the Pan-STARRS survey. This is also in line with the overall spectral type determined for Vestian asteroids.

Rotation period 

Several rotational lightcurves of Celle have been obtained from photometric observations since 2001. Analysis of the best-rated lightcurves gave a rotation period of 3.84 hours with a brightness amplitude between 0.11 and 0.17 magnitude.

Diameter and albedo 

According to the survey carried out by the NEOWISE mission of NASA's Wide-field Infrared Survey Explorer, Celle measures between 5.924 and 6.6 kilometers in diameter and its surface has an albedo between 0.232 and 0.5033.

The Collaborative Asteroid Lightcurve Link assumes a high albedo of 0.4 and calculates a diameter of 6.35 kilometers based on an absolute magnitude of 12.6.

Satellite 

Between September 2001, and February 2003, photometric observations of Celle were obtained with the 1.8-meter Vatican Advanced Technology Telescope on Mount Graham, Arizona, by American astronomers William Ryan at New Mexico Tech and NMHU in collaboration with Carlos Martinez and Lacey Stewart as part of a larger survey.

The discovery was announced on 3 May 2003.

Naming 

This minor planet was named after the German city of Celle on the occasion of its 700th anniversary. Celle is twinned with the Danish town of Holbæk, where the discovering Brorfelde Observatory is located. The official naming citation was published by the Minor Planet Center on 18 February 1992.

References

External links 
 Asteroids with Satellites, Robert Johnston, johnstonsarchive.net
 Asteroid Lightcurve Database (LCDB), query form (info )
 Dictionary of Minor Planet Names, Google books
 Asteroids and comets rotation curves, CdR – Observatoire de Genève, Raoul Behrend
 Discovery Circumstances: Numbered Minor Planets (1)-(5000) – Minor Planet Center
 
 

003782
Discoveries by Poul Jensen (astronomer)
Named minor planets
003782
003782
19861003